The 2010–11 2. Bundesliga was the 37th season of the 2. Bundesliga, Germany's second tier of its football league system. The season started on the weekend of 21 August 2010 and ended with the last games on 15 May 2011. The winter break was in effect between weekends around 18 December 2010 and 15 January 2011.

Team information
As in the previous year, the league comprise the teams placed fourth through fifteenth of the 2009–10 season, the worst two teams from the 2009–10 Bundesliga, the best two teams from the 2009–10 3. Liga, the losers of the Bundesliga relegation play-off between the 16th-placed Bundesliga team and the third-placed 2. Bundesliga team and the winners of the 2. Bundesliga relegation play-off between the 16th-placed 2. Bundesliga team and the third-placed 3. Liga team.

2009–10 2. Bundesliga champions 1. FC Kaiserslautern, and runners-up FC St. Pauli were promoted to the Bundesliga. They were replaced by VfL Bochum and Hertha BSC who finished 17th and 18th respectively in the 2009–10 Bundesliga season.

TuS Koblenz and Rot-Weiß Ahlen were relegated after the 2009–10 season. They were replaced by 2009–10 3. Liga champions VfL Osnabrück and runners-up FC Erzgebirge Aue.

Two further spots were available through relegation/promotion play-offs and taken by FC Augsburg and FC Ingolstadt 04. Augsburg lost in their promotion play-off against 16th placed Bundesliga team 1. FC Nürnberg and thus retained their 2. Bundesliga spot, while Ingolstadt earned promotion from the 3. Liga by defeating FC Hansa Rostock.

Stadiums and locations
FC Ingolstadt 04 moved into the newly built Audi Sportpark for this season after spending their previous seasons at Tuja-Stadion. Fortuna Düsseldorf increased the capacity of their Esprit Arena from 51,500 to 54,400 by converting some seating areas into standing terraces. Also, the stadia of SpVgg Greuther Fürth and MSV Duisburg were renamed due to new naming rights contracts.

Notes:
 Erzgebirgsstadion is undergoing reconstruction. The capacity is thus estimated, with the exact number not to be known until work has been completed.
 Fortuna Düsseldorf's home ground Esprit Arena was unavailable for the last three games of the season as it staged the Eurovision Song Contest 2011. A temporary stadium, the Lena-Arena, was constructed adjacent to the Esprit Arena to host the final home games of the season.

Personnel and sponsorship

Managerial changes

League table

Results

Relegation play-offs

VfL Osnabrück, having finished the season in 16th place, faced 3rd-placed 3. Liga side Dynamo Dresden for a two-legged play-off. Dresden, who played at home first, won 4–2 on aggregate.

Dynamo Dresden won 4–2 on aggregate; Dynamo promoted, Osnabrück relegated

Statistics

Top goalscorers
Source: kicker (German)
25 goals
  Nils Petersen (Energie Cottbus)

20 goals
  Benjamin Auer (Alemannia Aachen)

16 goals
  Benjamin Lauth (1860 Munich)

15 goals
  Sascha Mölders (FSV Frankfurt)
  Adrián Ramos (Hertha BSC)

14 goals
  Nando Rafael (FC Augsburg)

13 goals
  Pierre-Michel Lasogga (Hertha BSC)
  Stefan Leitl (FC Ingolstadt 04)

10 goals
  Stephan Hain (FC Augsburg)
  Jong Tae-Se (VfL Bochum)
  Emil Jula (Energie Cottbus)
  Raffael (Hertha BSC)
  Zoltán Stieber (Alemannia Aachen)

Top assistants
Source: kicker (German)
17 assists
  Zoltán Stieber (Alemannia Aachen)

12 assists
  Nikita Rukavytsya (Hertha BSC)

10 assists
  Adrián Ramos (Hertha BSC)

9 assists
  Daniel Halfar (1860 Munich)
  Emil Jula (Energie Cottbus)
  Stefan Leitl (FC Ingolstadt 04)
  Michael Thurk (FC Augsburg)

8 assists
  Skerdilaid Curri (Erzgebirge Aue)
  Jürgen Gjasula (FSV Frankfurt)
  Alexander Iashvili (Karlsruher SC)
  Sascha Rösler (Fortuna Düsseldorf)
  Timo Staffeldt (Karlsruher SC)

References

External links
 Official site 
 Bundesliga on DFB page 
 kicker magazine 

2. Bundesliga seasons
2010–11 in German football leagues
Germany